The Cardiff CELTS was a basketball team from Cardiff. The Celts competed in the English Basketball League, Division 1 and played their home games at the Sport Wales National Centre.

See also 
 Sport in Cardiff

External links
Official Cardiff CELTS website
Cardiff CELTS Womens Basketball Club
Cardiff CELTS Wheelchair Basketball Club
England Basketball website

Basketball teams in Wales
Sport in Cardiff